Vadim Shuvalov (born 17 February 1958, Kokhma, Ivanovo Oblast) is a Russian political figure, a deputy of the 8th State Duma. 

From 1989 to 2001, Shuvalov worked as Deputy Director for General Affairs of Surgut-1 Power Station. In 2001-2005, he headed the Surgut-1 Power Station. From 2007 to 2016, Shuvalov was the Deputy Executive Director for Prospective Development and, later, the Deputy General Director of Tyumenenergo. In 2006, he was elected deputy of the Surgut City Duma of the 4th convocation. From 2016 to 2020, he was the mayor of Surgut. From December 2020 to 2021, he was Deputy Governor of the Khanty-Mansi Autonomous Okrug. Since September 2021, he has served as deputy of the 8th State Duma.

References

1958 births
Living people
United Russia politicians
21st-century Russian politicians
Eighth convocation members of the State Duma (Russian Federation)
Seventh convocation members of the State Duma (Russian Federation)